is a Japanese footballer currently playing as a midfielder for V-Varen Nagasaki.

Career statistics

Club
.

Notes

References

External links

1997 births
Living people
Japanese footballers
Association football midfielders
Juntendo University alumni
J2 League players
Giravanz Kitakyushu players
V-Varen Nagasaki players